Persona is the fifth studio album by English electronic musician Rival Consoles. It was released on 13 April 2018, by Erased Tapes.

Critical reception

Persona was met with widespread acclaim reviews from critics.  Sean O’Neal of The A.V. Club described the album as "A truly 'arthouse' album that begs repeated revisiting, to explore its many conflicting faces." Lewis Wade of The Skinny reviewed "Persona is a gloriously potent success story, and a testament to his talent that he's managed to make one of the warmest and most reflective albums of the year so far, electronic or otherwise."

Track listing
All tracks written by Rival Consoles.

Charts

References

2018 albums
Rival Consoles albums
Erased Tapes Records albums